= Vascular Pharmacology =

- Discipline: Pharmacology
- Language: English
- Edited by: Joseph Miano

Publication details
- Former name(s): Comparative and General Pharmacology, General Pharmacology: The Vascular System
- History: 1970-present
- Publisher: Elsevier
- Frequency: Monthly
- Impact factor: 3.635 (2014)

Standard abbreviations
- ISO 4: Vasc. Pharmacol.

Indexing
- CODEN: VPAHAJ
- ISSN: 1537-1891 (print); 1879-3649 (web)
- LCCN: 2001212723
- OCLC no.: 48001679

Links
- Journal homepage; Online access; Online archive of General Pharmacology: The Vascular System; Online archive of Comparative and General Pharmacology

Vascular Pharmacology is a peer-reviewed medical journal covering research on all aspects of biology and pharmacology of the vascular system. It was established in 1970 as Comparative and General Pharmacology and renamed to General Pharmacology: The Vascular System in 1975, before obtaining its current name in 2002. The journal is published by Elsevier and the editor-in-chief is Joseph Miano (Medical College of Georgia at Augusta University).

== Abstracting and indexing ==
The journal is abstracted and indexed in BIOSIS Previews, CAB Abstracts, Chemical Abstracts, Current Contents/Life Sciences, EMBASE, MEDLINE, Science Citation Index, and Scopus.
